The Vernokhörner are a multi-summited mountain of the Lepontine Alps, located on the border between the Swiss cantons of Ticino and Graubünden. They lie approximately halfway between the lakes of Luzzone and Zervreila. The main summit has an elevation of 3,043 metres above sea level.

References

External links
 Vernokhörner on Hikr

Mountains of the Alps
Alpine three-thousanders
Mountains of Switzerland
Mountains of Graubünden
Mountains of Ticino
Graubünden–Ticino border
Lepontine Alps